Darya Sorokina (born 29 November 2002) is an Azerbaijani individual and group rhythmic gymnast. She is the 2022 World 3 Ribbons + 2 Balls bronze medalist. She is the 2020 European group all-around silver medalist and the 2022 European group all-around bronze medalist. She represented Azerbaijan at the 2020 Summer Olympics.

Career

Junior
In 2015, Sorokina joined Azerbaijani junior group which competed at the 2015 Junior European Championships in Minsk, Belarus and placed fourth in both the group all-around and 5 Balls finals. Then at the 2017 Junior European Championships in Budapest, Hungary, and finished in ninth place in the group all-around and were the first reserve for the 10 Clubs final. The Azerbaijani team of the junior group, Marina Durunda, and Zhala Piriyeva finished seventh.

Senior
Sorokina became age-eligible for senior competition in 2018. She switched to competing as an individual gymnast and made her senior international debut at the 2018 Portimao World Challenge Cup, where she took twenty-fifth place in the all-around. She also competed at the 2018 Minsk World Challenge Cup and placed forty-fifth in the all-around. Then at the Kazan World Challenge Cup, she finished twenty-seventh in the all-around. Together with Zohra Aghamirova and Veronika Hudis, she was a part of Azerbaijani team that competed at the 2018 World Championships in Sofia, Bulgaria that finished ninth place in the team competition. Individually, Sokokina finished in sixty-fourth place in the all-around competition.

In 2019, she finished in forty-fifth place in the all-around at the 2019 Sofia World Cup. Then she started training with Azerbaijani senior group and appeared at 2019 Cluj-Napoca World Challenge Cup replacing Siyana Vasileva. Her team took the silver medal in the group all-around and 5 Balls and the bronze with 3 Hoops + 4 Clubs. She represented Azerbaijan at the 2019 European Games in Minsk and helped the group finish sixth in the all-around, seventh in 5 Balls, and sixth in 3 Hoops + 4 Clubs. She was also a part of the group that took eighth place in the all-around and seventh in the 3 Hoops + 4 Clubs final at the 2019 World Championships in Baku. The group's eighth-place finish in the all-around qualified Azerbaijan a group spot for the 2020 Olympic Games.

Sorokina competed at the 2020 European Championships in Kyiv. Together with Laman Alimuradova, Zeynab Hummatova, Yelyzaveta Luzan and Maryam Safarova, she won a silver medal in group all-around and a bronze medal in 3 Hoops + 4 Clubs final. They also won the bronze medal in the team competition together with the juniors.

At the 2021 Sofia World Cup, Sorokina and the Azerbaijani group won the all-around silver medal and the bronze medal in the 3 Hoops + 4 Clubs final. Then at the Baku World Cup, the group won the bronze medal in the 5 Balls final and placed fourth in the all-around and fifth in the 3 Hoops + 4 Clubs final. At the 2021 European Championships, the Azerbaijani group placed seventh in the all-around and team event, sixth in the 5 Balls final, and fourth in the 3 Hoops + 4 Clubs final.

Sorokina was selected to represent Azerbaijan at the 2020 Summer Olympics alongside Laman Alimuradova, Zeynab Hummatova, Yelyzaveta Luzan, and Narmina Samadova. They finished tenth in the qualification round for the group all-around and were the second reserve for the final. She was then selected to compete at the 2021 World Championships. The Azerbaijani group finished sixth in the group all-around and qualified for both event finals. The group finished sixth in both the 5 balls and the 3 hoops + 4 clubs finals.

Sorokina and the Azerbaijani group won the 5 hoops gold medal and the all-around silver medal at the 2022 Baku World Cup. At the 2022 Pamplona World Challenge Cup, she won three bronze medals in the group all-around, 5 hoops, and 3 ribbons + 2 balls. Then at the European Championships in Tel Aviv, the Azerbaijani group won the bronze medals in the group all-around, 5 hoops, and 3 ribbons + 2 balls. She then represented Azerbaijan at the 2021 Islamic Solidarity Games where the Azerbaijani group won the gold medal in the all-around. Then in the event finals, they won gold in 3 ribbons + 2 balls and silver in 5 hoops behind Uzbekistan.

Sorokina competed at the 2022 World Championships alongside Laman Alimuradova, Gullu Aghalarzade, Zeynab Hummatova, and Yelyzaveta Luzan. In the 3 ribbons + 2 balls final, the group won the bronze medal behind Bulgaria and Italy. This marked the first time an Azerbaijani group won a medal at the Rhythmic Gymnastics World Championships.

References

External links 
 

Living people
2002 births
Azerbaijani rhythmic gymnasts
Sportspeople from Baku
Medalists at the Rhythmic Gymnastics European Championships
Gymnasts at the 2020 Summer Olympics
Olympic gymnasts of Azerbaijan
European Games competitors for Azerbaijan
Gymnasts at the 2019 European Games
Medalists at the Rhythmic Gymnastics World Championships